Park Township is the name of some places in the U.S. state of Michigan:

 Park Township, Ottawa County, Michigan
 Park Township, St. Joseph County, Michigan

Michigan township disambiguation pages